Patrick Doherty (born 18 July 1945) is a retired Sinn Féin politician, and was the abstentionist Member of Parliament for West Tyrone from 2001 to 2017. He was a member of the Northern Ireland Assembly for the Assembly constituency of the same name from June 1998 to June 2012. Doherty served as Vice President of Sinn Féin from 1988 to 2009, when Mary Lou McDonald became the party's new Vice President.

Political career
Doherty was born in Glasgow; his parents were from County Donegal in the Republic of Ireland. He moved to Donegal in 1968, shortly before the Troubles broke out across the Irish border. He was an abstentionist Sinn Féin Member of Parliament of the British parliament for West Tyrone from 2001 to 2017, as well as a member of the Northern Ireland Assembly from the 1998 elections until 2012. He has also stood for election in the Republic of Ireland, in the constituency of Donegal North-East in 1989, 1996 (a by-election) and 1997, and also in the Connacht–Ulster constituency in the EU elections in 1989 and 1994.

In May 2002, using parliamentary privilege, Ulster Unionist Party MP David Burnside named Doherty as a member of the IRA Army Council.

Personal life
According to The Times Guide to the House of Commons, Pat Doherty is married with three daughters and two sons, was educated at St Joseph's College, Lochwinnoch, and is a site engineer who likes building stone walls. He is the brother of former Provisional IRA member Hugh Doherty, known for his involvement in the Balcombe Street siege.

Over a two-and-a-half-year period Doherty spent £16,000 on printer cartridges, an amount that he admitted was "probably excessive".

In 2012, to some surprise, Doherty supported funding for a loyalist flute band in Castlederg. He praised the band in the application for reaching out to "all sections of the community". The band had sought support for its funding application from a community group who then, unbeknownst to the band, reached out to Doherty. A spokesman for the band, whose website features a song commemorating deceased Ulster Volunteer Force member Brian Robinson, distanced themselves from the application, claiming the band was unaware of Doherty's support and did not want it. He added that "The band harbours nothing but contempt for Irish republicanism and its attacks on their community". Four of the band's members were killed by the IRA.

References

External links
Guardian Unlimited Politics – ask Aristotle: Pat Doherty
TheyWorkForYou.com – Pat Doherty MP

1945 births
Irish republicans
Living people
Members of the Northern Ireland Forum
Members of the Parliament of the United Kingdom for County Tyrone constituencies (since 1922)
Northern Ireland MLAs 1998–2003
Northern Ireland MLAs 2003–2007
Northern Ireland MLAs 2007–2011
Northern Ireland MLAs 2011–2016
Politicians from Glasgow
Provisional Irish Republican Army members
Sinn Féin MLAs
Sinn Féin MPs (post-1921)
Scottish people of Irish descent
UK MPs 2001–2005
UK MPs 2005–2010
UK MPs 2010–2015
UK MPs 2015–2017